Camilla Mickwitz (22 September 1934 – 4 July 1989) was a Finland-Swedish writer, illustrator, and animator. Mickwitz wrote children's literature, usually addressing family and social issues.

Biography
In 1959, Mickwitz graduated from the Institute of Industrial Arts in Helsinki. Mickwitz belonged to the Swedish-speaking minority.

Works
Over Mickwitz's career, she created a total of twenty picture books and the same number of animations.

One of Mickwitz's first popular series was Jason — based upon the title character and his single mother. Four animations were made between 1972 and 1974. The first short, titled Jason, was released in 1972. The animated series was then adapted into a children's book series. The third in the series was titled  and was published the following year in 1977. The final book, titled , was published in 1978.

A year after Jason, Mickwitz created another series, titled after the protagonist, Emilia. The first book, titled  which translates to 'Emilia and three little aunts', was released in 1979.

In 1983, Mickwitz wrote Mimosa, a book that would later be adapted into an animated short the same year, starring  and Eero Saarinen. Mickwitz wrote and animated the short.

Also In 1983, Mickwitz animated the intro and designed the logo for Finnish TV show Pikku Kakkonen.

Awards
For her work in children's literature, Mickwitz won the Finnish State Prize for Cinema in 1973, and 1979, the Finnish State Prize for Literature in 1973, 1976, and 1986, and the Finnish Children's Culture Prize in 1987. She is also a four-time winner of the Rudolf Koivu prize, winning in 1977, 1979, 1981, and 1984.

The Jason series won several awards. Both the animation and the book  won the prize for the best children's animation at the Hollywood Festival of World Television in 1975, and the IBBY Honour award for illustration in 1978.  won the Arvid Lydecken Prize in 1979.

References

1934 births
1989 deaths
20th-century Finnish writers
20th-century Finnish women artists
20th-century Finnish women writers
Finnish children's writers
Finnish women illustrators
Finnish children's book illustrators
Finnish animators
Finnish animated film directors
Swedish-speaking Finns
Finnish women animators
Finnish women children's writers